Green Chimneys is an album by pianist Kenny Barron which was recorded in Holland in 1983 and first released on the Dutch Criss Cross Jazz label. The 1988 CD reissue included six bonus tracks.

Reception 

In his review on AllMusic, Scott Yanow stated "In the 1980s, Kenny Barron was recognized as one of jazz's top pianists, a modern mainstream master who two decades later is still in prime form."

Track listing 
 "Softly, as in a Morning Sunrise" (Sigmund Romberg, Oscar Hammerstein II) – 4:38
 "Don't Explain" (Arthur Herzog Jr., Billie Holiday) – 5:46
 "There Is No Greater Love" (Isham Jones, Marty Symes) – 11:42
 "Skylark" (Hoagy Carmichael, Johnny Mercer) – 7:26 Bonus track on CD reissue
 "Green Chimneys" (Thelonious Monk) – 6:48
 "Straight, No Chaser" (Monk) – 6:10
 "Time Was" (Harry Akst) – 8:50 Bonus track on CD reissue
 "When Lights Are Low" (Benny Carter, Spencer Williams) – 6:25 Bonus track on CD reissue
 "Morning Blues" (Kenny Barron) – 4:50 Bonus track on CD reissue
 "Time Was" [take 2] (Akst) – 5:16 Bonus track on CD reissue

Recorded at Studio 44, Monster, Netherlands on July 9, 1983 (tracks 1–3, 5–7 & 10) and at Rudy Van Gelder Studio, Englewood Cliffs, NJ on December 31, 1987 (tracks 4, 8 & 9)

Personnel 
Kenny Barron – piano
Buster Williams – bass
Ben Riley – drums

References 

Kenny Barron albums
1984 albums
Criss Cross Jazz albums
Albums recorded at Van Gelder Studio